The 2000 Volleyball America's Cup was the third edition of the annual men's volleyball tournament, played by six countries from North-, Central- and South America. The tournament was held from August 11 to August 20, 2000, in São Bernardo, Brazil.

Main Round

Friday 2000-08-11

Saturday 2000-08-12

Sunday 2000-08-13

Monday 2000-08-14

Tuesday 2000-08-15

Wednesday 2000-08-16

Thursday 2000-08-17

Final round

Semi-finals
Saturday 2000-08-19

Finals
Sunday 2000-08-20 — Bronze Medal Match

Sunday 2000-08-20 — Gold Medal Match

Final ranking

Awards
Best Spiker

Best Receiver

Best Blocker

Best Digger

Best Server

Best Setter

References
 Sports123
 Results
 More Results and Awards (Archived 2009-07-25)

Volleyball America's Cup
A
Volleyball
Volleyball